Jason Ortitay is a member of the Pennsylvania House of Representatives, representing the 46th House district in Allegheny County and Washington County, Pennsylvania.

Committee assignments 

 Education, Subcommittee on Special Education - Chair
 Environmental Resources & Energy, Subcommittee on Parks and Forests - Chair
 Gaming Oversight
 State Government, Subcommittee on Government Operations - Chair

References

External links
Campaign Web Site
Official Web Site
PA House profile

Living people
People from Allegheny County, Pennsylvania
Republican Party members of the Pennsylvania House of Representatives
21st-century American politicians
Robert Morris University alumni
1984 births